The Osmanya script, also known as Far Soomaali ("Somali writing") and, in Arabic, as al-kitābah al-ʿuthmānīyah ("Osman writing"), is a writing script created to transcribe the Somali language. It was invented between 1920 and 1922 by Osman Yusuf Kenadid, the son of Sultan Yusuf Ali Kenadid and brother of Sultan Ali Yusuf Kenadid of the Sultanate of Hobyo.

History

While Osmanya gained reasonably wide acceptance in Somalia and quickly produced a considerable body of literature, it proved difficult to spread among the population mainly due to stiff competition from the long-established Arabic script as well as the emerging Somali Latin alphabet developed by a number of leading scholars of Somali, including Musa Haji Ismail Galal, B. W. Andrzejewski and Shire Jama Ahmed. 

As nationalist sentiments grew and since the Somali language had long lost its ancient script, the adoption of a universally recognized writing script for the Somali language became an important point of discussion. After independence, little progress was made on the issue, as opinion was divided over whether the Arabic or Latin scripts should be used instead.

In October 1972, because of the Latin script's simplicity, its ability to cope with all of the sounds in the language, and the widespread existence of machines and typewriters designed for its use, made President Mohamed Siad Barre require it for writing Somali instead of the Arabic or Osmanya scripts. Barre's administration subsequently launched a massive literacy campaign designed to ensure its sole adoption, which led to a sharp decline in use of Osmanya.

Description
The direction of reading and writing in Osmanya is from left to right. Letter names are based on the names of letters in Arabic, and the long vowels uu and ii are represented by the letters waaw and yaa, respectively.

Letters

Numbers

Unicode

Osmanya script was added to the Unicode Standard in April 2003 with the release of version 4.0.

The Unicode block for Osmanya is U+10480–U+104AF:

See also 
 Kaddare script
 Somali alphabets

Notes

References
 I.M. Lewis (1958) Bulletin of the School of Oriental and African Studies, University of London, Vol. 21 pp 134–156.

External links
 Osmanya, Borama, Wadaad's writing and the Somali language
 Afkeenna iyo fartiisa - a book in Osmanya
 Somali Native Alphabet
 The report of the Somali Language Committee
 Unicode assignments for Osmanya characters
 Osmanya Unicode Fonts
 Osmanya online keyboard - Lexilogos

Writing systems of Africa
Somali language
Somali orthography
Obsolete writing systems
1920s establishments in Somalia